Ľubomír Ulrich (born 1 February 1989) is a Slovak football striker who currently plays for Spartak Myjava.

External links
Futbalnet profile
Eurofotbal.cz profile

References

1989 births
Living people
Slovak footballers
Association football forwards
FK Dubnica players
FK Slovan Duslo Šaľa players
Spartak Myjava players
PFK Piešťany players
MFK Skalica players
ŠKF Sereď players
Slovak Super Liga players
2. Liga (Slovakia) players
3. Liga (Slovakia) players